San Nicola la Strada is a comune (municipality) in the Province of Caserta in the Italian region Campania, located about  northeast of Naples and about  south of Caserta.

References

External links
 Official website

Cities and towns in Campania